The 2018 Nidahas Trophy was a T20 cricket tournament that was held in Sri Lanka in March 2018. It was a tri-nation series between Bangladesh, India and Sri Lanka. Each team played each other twice, with two teams progressing to the final. The tournament was played to celebrate Sri Lanka's 70th year of independence; the title derives from the Sinhalese නිදහස් nidahas, meaning "freedom." Sri Lanka Cricket confirmed that the matches would be played as Twenty20 International fixtures. The fixtures and venue were announced in November 2017, with all the matches played at the R. Premadasa Stadium in Colombo. This was the first occasion that Discovery Networks Asia Pacific channel DSport acquired media rights to broadcast live cricket matches involving the Indian cricket team.

India progressed to the final after they beat Bangladesh by 17 runs in the fifth T20I match. Bangladesh joined India in the final, after they beat Sri Lanka by 2 wickets in the final group game. In the final, India beat Bangladesh by four wickets to win the tournament.

Squads

Initially, Shakib Al Hasan was ruled out of Bangladesh's squad before the start of the tournament due to injury. He was replaced by Litton Das with Mahmudullah named as captain. However, Shakib rejoined the Bangladesh squad ahead of the sixth T20I match.

Sri Lanka's captain Dinesh Chandimal was given a two-match ban for a slow over-rate following the match against Bangladesh on 10 March 2018. Thisara Perera was named as Sri Lanka's captain in Chandimal's absence.

Points table

Group stage

1st match

2nd match

3rd match

4th match

5th match

6th match

Final

Controversy
During the sixth T20I match between Sri Lanka and Bangladesh, Shakib Al Hasan accused the umpires for not signalling a no-ball delivery when Isuru Udana bowled two bouncer deliveries to Mustafizur Rahman in the last over of the match, when Bangladesh needed 12 runs off six balls to win. Mahmudullah, who was on the non-striker's end when Mustafizur Rahman was batting, demanded that a no-ball be signalled by the on-field umpires. Shakib later threatened to leave the field and recalled the batsmen from the field as a result of the umpiring errors. Reserve Bangladeshi cricketer Nurul Hasan was also suspected to have breached the code of conduct for arguing with Sri Lankan captain Thisara Perera. It was also revealed that Shakib exchanged insults with Sri Lankan commentator Russell Arnold. The International Cricket Council (ICC) later imposed a 25 percent fine on match fees and issued a demerit point to both Shakib and Nurul Hasan for breaching the code of ethics. After the sixth T20I between Sri Lanka and Bangladesh concluded, the door to the Bangladeshi dressing room was shattered. It was later revealed that Shakib Al Hasan accidentally broke the glass door by pulling it backwards rather than pulling from the forward position.

References

External links
 Series home at ESPN Cricinfo

2018 in Bangladeshi cricket
2018 in Indian cricket
2018 in Sri Lankan cricket
Bangladeshi cricket tours of Sri Lanka
Indian cricket tours of Sri Lanka
International cricket competitions in 2017–18
Twenty20 International cricket competitions